Jorge Luiz de Amorim Silva (born 5 September 1979) is a Brazilian football player.

Club statistics

References

External links

1979 births
Living people
Brazilian footballers
Brazilian expatriate footballers
J2 League players
Omiya Ardija players
Ventforet Kofu players
Expatriate footballers in Japan
Association football forwards